Tom Tavares-Finson  (born 7 July 1953) is a Jamaican attorney-at-law and President of the Senate of Jamaica.

Biography
Tavares-Finson was born in Kingston, Jamaica.. He was educated at the Jamaica College; McMaster University (Ontario, Canada); the Institute of Commonwealth Studies, University of London; and the Honourable Society of the Middle Temple.

He is a member of the Bar Association of Jamaica, the Advocates Association of Jamaica, and the Lay Magistrates’ Association. He is also a member of the Senate and of the Central Executive & Standing Committee of the Jamaica Labour Party.

Senator Tavares-Finson has been a nominated commissioner of the Electoral Commission of Jamaica since 2006 and previously served as a member of the Electoral Advisory Committee from 2005–2006.

He also serves as a Director at D.C. Tavares & Finson Co. Ltd.
He is married to Rose Tavares-Finson, née Costantini. They have a daughter named Capri  (2001) and a son named Roman (2003).

He has a son Christian (1982) and a daughter Leah (1986) from a previous marriage to Cindy Breakspeare.

References

1953 births
Members of the Senate of Jamaica
20th-century Jamaican lawyers
People from Kingston, Jamaica
Living people
Members of the Middle Temple
21st-century Jamaican politicians
21st-century Jamaican lawyers
Jamaican Queen's Counsel